Mokraya Kitsa is a rural locality (an inhabited locality) in Pushnovsky Territorial Okrug of Kolsky District of Murmansk Oblast, Russia, located on the Kola Peninsula beyond the Arctic Circle. Population: 40 (2010 Census).

References

Notes

Sources

Rural localities in Murmansk Oblast